Dysuria refers to painful or uncomfortable urination.

It is one of a constellation of irritative bladder symptoms (also sometimes referred to as lower urinary tract symptoms), which includes nocturia and urinary frequency.

Diagnosis
The clinician should also look for physical findings of fever, rash, direct tenderness over the bladder area, and joint pain. Physical findings of increased temperature, increased pulse, low blood pressure in the presence of dysuria can indicate systemic infection. Urological obstruction due to stone or tumor can result in findings of hematuria, decreased urination, and bladder spasms. All these physical findings should be looked for carefully while obtaining history. History regarding recent sexual activity is crucial.

Urinalysis is the most useful test to start the work up in a patient of dysuria. Urinalysis positive for nitrite carries a high predictive value of a positive urine culture. Also, urine dipstick showing leukocytes as equal predictive value as the presence of nitrites. When both are present, the predictive value goes even higher. If the patient only has leukocyte esterase or bacteria in the urine, then dysuria may suggest that the patient probably has urethritis.

Differential diagnosis
This is typically described to be a burning or stinging sensation. It is most often a result of a urinary tract infection.  It may also be due to an STD, bladder stones, bladder tumors, and virtually any condition of the prostate. It can also occur as a side effect of anticholinergic medication used for Parkinson's disease.

Drugs and irritants
 Chemical irritants, e.g., soaps, tampons, toilet papers
 Drugs, e.g., Cyclophosphamide, Ketamine
 Capsaicin consumption, e.g., habanero peppers

Genital
 Benign prostatic hyperplasia (male)
 Endometriosis (female)
 Prostatic cancer (male)
 Prostatitis (male)
 Vaginitis (female)

Urinary tract
One of the most common causes of dysuria is urinary tract infection. Urinary tract infections are more common in females than males due to female anatomy, having a shorter and straight urethra compared to males who have a longer and curved urethra due to male anatomy. In females, bacteria can reach the bladder more easily due to shorter and straight urethra as they have less distance to travel. Because of these reasons, females tend to experience dysuria more frequently compared to males. Also, most urinary tract infections are uncomplicated.
 Chlamydia
 Cystitis
 Hemorrhagic cystitis
 Kidney stones
 Malignancy, i.e., bladder cancer, prostatic cancer, or urethral cancer
 Prostatic enlargement, i.e., benign prostatic hyperplasia (male), prostatic cancer
 Prostatitis (male)
 Pyelonephritis
 Sexually transmitted disease
 Trichomoniasis
 Urethral stricture
 Urethritis
 Urinary schistosomiasis
 Urinary tract infection (UTI) caused by bacterial infection

Other
 Diverticulitis
 Hypotension
 Mass in the abdomen
 Reactive arthritis
 Acute intermittent porphyria
 Hereditary coproporphyria
 Variegate porphyria

References

External links 

Symptoms and signs: Urinary system